Narayana Superspeciality Hospital is a super-speciality hospital located in Howrah, West Bengal.  It is a unit of the Narayana Health group and treats patients from the twin cities of Howrah and Kolkata in West Bengal, India. Its sister hospital is Narayana Multispeciality Hospital, Howrah. The hospital, established by Dr. Devi Prasad Shetty, is a centre for oncology and cardiac sciences facilities in Eastern India. Its tertiary care services include cardiac surgery, neurology, neurosurgery and orthopaedics.

The hospital also treats patients from parts of the North-Eastern states of India and the neighbouring countries such as Bangladesh, Bhutan and Nepal. The cancer treatment is aligned with the treatment of organ-specific cancers and is backed by integrated oncology facilities including Radiotherapy, Haemato Oncology, Paediatric Oncology, Pain and Palliation Oncology, Gynae Oncology and Advanced Brachytherapy.

The hospital provides an aggregate of 41 services along with a cancer support cell, which aims to raise funds for cancer patients, physiotherapy, nutrition, preventive health checks, counselling, emergency services and trauma care.

Awards
Best Hospital in Eastern India for Oncology & Services | ET Inspiring Leaders, East (2022), an initiative by the Times Group
Times Leading Cancer Care & Services | Times Business Awards 2022

References

External links
Official Website

Hospitals in West Bengal
Hospitals in Kolkata
Hospitals in India
Narayana Health